Tosh may refer to:

People 
 Tosh (surname)
 Tosh (nickname)
 Tosh Townend (born 1985), professional skateboarder
 Tosh Van der Sande (born 1990), Belgian professional cyclist

Places
 Tosh, Himachal Pradesh, India; a village
 Kiryas Tosh (aka Tosh), Boisbriand, Quebec, Canada; a neighbourhood
 Yiddish name of Nyírtass, a Hungarian village

Entertainment 
 "Tosh" (song), by the English electronic music band Fluke
 Tosh.0 a comedy show hosted by Daniel Tosh
 Pseudonym of Shun Saeki, artist of Food Wars: Shokugeki no Soma
 Tosh, one of the Goofy Gophers in Warner Bros. cartoons
 Nickname of DC Alfred Lines, a character in the television series The Bill
 Nickname of Toshiko Sato, a character in the television series Torchwood
 Fiona Mackintosh, nicknamed Tosh, a character from the BBC soap opera EastEnders
 Nickname of DS Alison McIntosh, a character from the television series Shetland

Other 
 The Orthopedic Specialty Hospital (TOSH), Murray, Utah
 Tosh (Hasidic dynasty), a Hasidic dynasty originating in Nyirtass, Hungary

See also